Veena Devi (born 22 April 1967) is an Indian politician and the current Member of parliament from Vaishali. She is a former member of Bihar Legislative Assembly from the Gaighat constituency. In the 2019 Indian general election, she contested from Vaishali with Lok Janshakti Party and defeated Raghuvansh Prasad Singh.

Political career 
On 2 September 2021, she became the parliamentary chairperson of Lok Janshakti Party replacing Chirag Kumar Paswan.

Early life
Devi was born on 22 April 1967 in Darbhanga, Bihar, to Upendra Prasad Singh and Sabujkala Devi. She is a matriculate. She married Dinesh Prasad Singh, who is the MLC from Muzaffarpur, on 27 April 1984. They have two sons and two daughters. She lives in Dauadpur village.

She became an MLA in the Vidhan Sabha election in 2010 in Gaighat with BJP. She had contested the 2010 Vidhan Sabha elections from Ghaighat Seat on the BJP ticket. She was ex Chairperson from Muzaffarpur. She became the chairperson of Muzaffarpur district in 2001 and the deputy chairperson in 2006.

See also 
Caste politics in India

References

External links 
MyNeta Profile
Lok Sabha profile

Living people
1967 births
Bihar MLAs 2010–2015
Women members of the Lok Sabha
Women members of the Bihar Legislative Assembly
Lok Sabha members from Bihar
Lok Janshakti Party politicians
India MPs 2019–present
21st-century Indian women politicians